Jonathan Glatzer (born 21 October 1969) is an American writer, director, and producer.

Life and career 
Glatzer is a writer and producer for Seasons 2 and 3 of AMC's Better Call Saul.  He is a writer and supervising producer for Seasons 1 and 2 of HBO's Succession created by Jesse Armstrong, and executive consultant for Season 3. In 2016/17, he served as executive producer and writer for Bliss, created by David Cross.  He was executive story editor for Bloodline on Netflix and wrote episodes 3,5 and 9 for their first season. Along with his fellow writers, he's received a Primetime Emmy Award, two Peabody Awards, a Golden Globe and a WGA award and has been nominated for two Primetime Emmys, and five WGA awards. In 2013, his feature script FYNBOS, directed by Harry Patramanis opened the Slamdance Film Festival.  e
.  It was also on the programme for the Berlin Film Festival in February, 2013.  Glatzer's first feature film as director, co-writer and producer was What Goes Up. The film, starring Steve Coogan, Olivia Thirlby, Hilary Duff, Molly Shannon and Josh Peck, is about a reporter and a group of dysfunctional high school students in the aftermath of the Challenger
disaster. It was released on May 29, 2009. The film was distributed by Sony Pictures, with a DVD release on June 16, 2009 by Sony Home Entertainment.

Jon grew up in north caldwell, NJ. Glatzer began his career in theater as a director, staging productions at such venues as the Oxford Playhouse in England, the Shakespeare Theatre Company in Washington, D.C., and the Ensemble Studio Theatre in New York. He attended Colgate University and graduated in 1991. He then attended Columbia University's Film School, where his short Prix Fixe won the school's best film award.  Glatzer has also worked as a writer for Touchstone Television and Fox, Warner Brothers, Good Machine and Industry Entertainment. With Robert Lawson, he developed Tyler's Gap, a series for ABC Studios and Fox Television for which David Duchovny and Rob Bowman were executive producers. In 2010, he  directed a series of ads against California Proposition 23 (2010). He is a screenwriting fellow at the MacDowell Colony and has taught workshops in writing, directing and acting at Georgetown University and Colgate University.

References

American film directors
American male screenwriters
Living people
1969 births
Primetime Emmy Award winners